FC Portovik-Energiya Kholmsk is a Russian football team from Kholmsk. It played professionally from 1969 to 1975 and from 1989 to 1995, including two seasons (1992–1993) in the second-highest Russian First Division.

Team name and location history
 1969–1992 FC Sakhalin Yuzhno-Sakhalinsk (in 2004 another club also called FC Sakhalin Yuzhno-Sakhalinsk was established, as of 2007 it plays in the Russian Second Division)
 1993–1998 FC Sakhalin Kholmsk
 1999–2006 FC Portovik Kholmsk
 2007–present FC Portovik-Energiya Kholmsk

External links
  Team history at KLISF(Internet Archive)

Association football clubs established in 1969
Football clubs in Russia
Sport in Sakhalin Oblast
1969 establishments in Russia